David Smail (born 20 May 1970) is a professional golfer from New Zealand.

He was born in and resides in Hamilton, New Zealand. He won the New Zealand Open in 2001. He has won five titles on the Japan Golf Tour and has featured in the top 100 of the Official World Golf Rankings. He has at times in his career been the highest ranked New Zealand golfer.

Professional wins (7)

Japan Golf Tour wins (5)

*Note: The 2002 Casio World Open was shortened to 54 holes due to rain.
 The Japan Open Golf Championship is also a Japan major championship.

Japan Golf Tour playoff record (0–2)

PGA Tour of Australasia wins (2)

Playoff record
Other playoff record (0–1)

Results in major championships

CUT = missed the half-way cut
"T" = tied

Team appearances
World Cup (representing New Zealand): 2001, 2003, 2004, 2008, 2009

References

External links

New Zealand male golfers
PGA Tour of Australasia golfers
Japan Golf Tour golfers
Sportspeople from Hamilton, New Zealand
1970 births
Living people